Medawara Kala is village located in Ballia district, Uttar Pradesh. It has a total of 141 families residing. Madawara Kalan has a population of 783 as per the Population Census of 2011. Medawara comes under erstwhile 'Garha paragana' of Ballia district. The fertile land around Medawara and surrounding village is known as 'Shaila Taal'.

Administration
Medawara Kala is administered by Pradhan through its Gram Panchayat as per the Constitution of India and Panchayati Raj Act.

Medawara Kala events
This small village suddenly came in to news after the 2012 Delhi gang rape incident. Victim Nirbhaya's family belongs to Medawara Kalan. Akhilesh Yadav, Chief Minister of Uttar Pradesh then, visited this village and announced a Primary Health Center (PHC) for the villagers.

Nearby places
Ballia
Buxar
Mughalsarai
Chitbara Gaon
Rasra
Karimuddinpur
Khardiha

References

External links
Villages in Ballia Uttar Pradesh

Villages in Ballia district